Cacia lacrimosa is a species of beetle in the family Cerambycidae. It was described by K. M. Heller in 1923. It is known from the Philippines.

References

Cacia (beetle)
Beetles described in 1923